A tension control bolt (TC bolt) is a heavy duty bolt used in steel frame construction. The head is usually domed and is not designed to be driven. The end of the shank has a spline on it which is engaged by a special power wrench which prevents the bolt from turning while the nut is tightened. When the appropriate tension is reached the spline shears off.

See also
Screw list
Shear pin

References

Metalworking
Threaded fasteners
Torque